Dr. Daljit Singh Cheema (born 2 March 1962) is an Indian politician from the state of Punjab and was the Education Minister in the Punjab government.

Educational/professional qualification
Cheema completed his M.B.B.S. medical degree. He took six-month residencies in Orthopedics and Ophthalmology from the Guru Gobind Singh Medical College (G.G.S. Medical College), Faridkot.

Constituency
Cheema represented the Rupnagar Assembly Constituency of Punjab from 2012–2017.
During this span of his serving his constituency as the MLA of Ropar, this region has seen developments such as First and IIT of Punjab has been set up in Ropar. Rupnagar Flyover has been developed as one of its own kind in the whole state.

Political party  
Cheema is an active member of Shiromani Akali Dal. He is designated as Secretary and Spokesman to Shiromani Akali Dal. Earlier he also served the Party as Advisor to Chief Minister, Punjab (in the rank of Cabinet Minister) in 2007-2012.

Other positions
Education Minister of Punjab (2012–2017)
Member of Legislative Assembly, Punjab from Rupnagar Assembly Constituency (2012–2017)
Chairman - Sub Committee of CABE (Central Advisory Board for Education)
Member State Literacy Mission Authority, Punjab

References

People from Gurdaspur
Shiromani Akali Dal politicians
Living people
1962 births
Members of the Punjab Legislative Assembly
Punjabi people